Latillé is a commune in the Vienne department in the Nouvelle-Aquitaine region in western France.

See also
Communes of the Vienne department

References

Communes of Vienne